Janusz Bobik (born 17 December 1955 in Środa Śląska) is a Polish show jumping equestrian, Olympic medalist from 1980.

Olympic record 
Bobik participated at the 1980 Summer Olympics in Moscow, where he won a silver medal in team jumping.

References 

1955 births
Living people
Olympic silver medalists for Poland
Equestrians at the 1980 Summer Olympics
Olympic equestrians of Poland
Polish male equestrians
Olympic medalists in equestrian
People from Środa Śląska
Sportspeople from Lower Silesian Voivodeship
Medalists at the 1980 Summer Olympics
20th-century Polish people